Veyretella is a genus of terrestrial flowering plants in the orchid family, Orchidaceae. It contains two known species, both endemic to Gabon.

Veyretella flabellata Szlach., Marg. & Mytnik
Veyretella hetaerioides (Summerh.) Szlach. & Olszewski

See also
 List of Orchidaceae genera

References

Orchids of Gabon
Orchideae genera
Orchideae